Ambrose Lowth (died 1545) was an English politician.

He was a Member of Parliament (MP) for Colchester in 1523.

References

English MPs 1523
People from Colchester
Year of birth unknown
1545 deaths